The  Georgia Force season was the eighth season for the franchise in the Arena Football League. The team was coached by Dean Cokinos and played their home games at the Arena at Gwinnett Center. This was the first season for the Force since 2008, after the league went on hiatus in 2009 and the franchise was not active in 2010. In the regular season, the Force went 11–7, qualifying for the playoffs as the 3rd seed in the American Conference. They defeated the Cleveland Gladiators 50–41 in the conference semifinals, but lost 55–64 to the Jacksonville Sharks in the conference championship.

Standings

Schedule

Regular season
The Force began the season at home against the Tulsa Talons on March 13. They will finish the regular season on the road against the Iowa Barnstormers on July 23.

Playoffs

Regular season

Week 1: vs. Tulsa Talons

Week 2: at Jacksonville Sharks

Week 3: BYE

Week 4: at New Orleans VooDoo

Week 5: vs. Dallas Vigilantes

Week 6: vs. Orlando Predators

Week 7: at Milwaukee Mustangs

Week 8: vs. Pittsburgh Power

Week 9: vs. Utah Blaze

Week 10: at Philadelphia Soul

Week 11: vs. Jacksonville Sharks

Week 12: at San Jose SaberCats

Week 13: vs. Tampa Bay Storm

Week 14: at Cleveland Gladiators

Week 15: vs. New Orleans VooDoo

Week 16: at Orlando Predators

Week 17: BYE

Week 18: vs. Chicago Rush

Week 19: at Tampa Bay Storm

Week 20: at Iowa Barnstormers

Playoffs

American Conference Semifinals: at (2) Cleveland Gladiators

American Conference Championship: at (1) Jacksonville Sharks

References

Georgia Force
Georgia Force seasons
2011 in sports in Georgia (U.S. state)